Robert Jones (born 11 March 1945) is a Welsh composer, organist and choirmaster.

Biography
Jones studied music at the University of Wales and has a Fellowship Diploma from the Royal College of Organists. After 30 years as a high-school teacher, he is now retired, but still active as a composer and organist. He now lives in Monmouth, South Wales.

In German-speaking countries the main publisher of Jones' works is Dr. J. Butz from Bonn. In England his main publisher is Kevin Mayhew.

Works
Missa brevis in D (2014)
Missa brevis in C (2013)
Missa brevis in F for upper voices and organ or piano (2013)
Pastoralmesse (2016)
Organ works in eight volumes (2005-2018)
Triptyque Three Pieces for solo instrument (C / B) and organ (2013)
Psalm 150 (2016)
 more than 50 songs and motets

External links
 Works by Robert Jones at J. Butz Publishers
 CDs featuring music by Robert Jones at Classicophon music production
 Jones' Compositions Chor an der Stiftskirche, Sankt Johann Baptist und Petrus, Bonn

1945 births
Welsh classical composers
Welsh male classical composers
Welsh classical organists
British male organists
People from Monmouth, Wales
Living people
Alumni of the University of Wales
21st-century organists
21st-century British male musicians
Male classical organists